CSI: Unsolved! is a video game based on the CSI: Crime Scene Investigation television series developed by Canadian studio Other Ocean Interactive. It is the tenth CSI game released, including CSI: Miami and CSI: NY.  It was released on 23 November 2010 for the Nintendo DS, along with CSI: Fatal Conspiracy on consoles and the PC.

The player must play through all new mini games including Toxicology screening, Bullets comparison, UV light for investigations and sample comparison.

Reception

The game was met with mixed reviews, as GameRankings gave it a score of 62%, while Metacritic gave it 61 out of 100.

References

External links
Official site

2010 video games
Adventure games
Unsolved
Nintendo DS games
Nintendo DS-only games
Other Ocean Interactive games
Single-player video games
Ubisoft games
Video games about police officers
Video games developed in Canada
Video games set in the Las Vegas Valley